Vierkirchen-Esterhofen station is a railway station in the municipality of Vierkirchen, located in the Dachau district in Upper Bavaria, Germany.

Renaming
The station was renamed on 28 May 2000 from Esterhofen to Vierkirchen-Esterhofen. Esterhofen is a district of the municipality of Vierkirchen.

References

External links

Munich S-Bahn stations
Railway stations in Bavaria
Railway stations in Germany opened in 1898
1898 establishments in Bavaria
Buildings and structures in Dachau (district)